Sigilliclystis is a genus of moths in the family Geometridae.

Species
Sigilliclystis encteta (L.B. Prout, 1934)
Sigilliclystis insigillata (Walker, 1862)
Sigilliclystis kendricki Galsworthy, 1999
Sigilliclystis lunifera (Holloway, 1979)

References

Eupitheciini